The 1974–75 UEFA Cup was won by Borussia Mönchengladbach over Twente on aggregate.

The third club was revoked to Scotland and Belgium, and it was assigned to the Netherlands and Austria.

First round

|}

First leg

Second leg

Lyon won 11–1 on aggregate.

Portadown won 2–1 on aggregate.

Derby County won 6–2 on aggregate.

3–3 on aggregate, Twente won on away goals rule.

1–1 on aggregate, Ajax won on away goals rule.

RWD Molenbeek won 5–2 on aggregate.

Hibernian won 12–3 on aggregate.

Porto won 5–4 on aggregate.

Inter Milan won 3–0 on aggregate.

Partizan won 5–2 on aggregate.

Djurgården won 7–1 on aggregate.

Dinamo București won 4–0 on aggregate.

3–3 on aggregate, Velež Mostar won on away goals rule.

Steagul Roșu Brașov won 3–2 on aggregate.

Borussia Mönchengladbach won 4–2 on aggregate.

2–2 on aggregate, Royal Antwerp won on away goal rules.

1–1 on aggregate, Dynamo Dresden won on away goal rules.

Hamburg won 4–0 on aggregate.

Rapid Wien won 3–2 on aggregate.

Baník Ostrava won 5–0 on aggregate.

4–4 on aggregate, Raba ETO Győr won 5–4 in penalty shoot-out.

4–4 on aggregate, Dynamo Moscow won on away goals rule.

Nantes won 3–2 on aggregate.

Napoli won 3–1 on aggregate.

Juventus won 4–2 on aggregate.

Grasshopper won 3–2 on aggregate.

Fortuna Düsseldorf won 4–2 on aggregate.

Köln won 9–2 on aggregate.

Both legs were played in Amsterdam, the second leg was formally a 'home' game for Hibernians. Amsterdam won 12–0 on aggregate.

Atlético Madrid won 6–3 on aggregate.

Real Zaragoza won 5–1 on aggregate.

Second round

|}

First leg

Second leg

4–4 on aggregate, Derby County won 7–6 in penalty shoot-out.

Juventus won 8–2 on aggregate.

Partizan won 6–1 on aggregate.

Baník Ostrava won 2–1 on aggregate.

Köln won 4–3 on aggregate.

Fortuna Düsseldorf won 3–2 on aggregate.

Velež Mostar won 2–1 on aggregate.

1–1 on aggregate, Dynamo Dresden won 4–3 in penalty shoot-out.

Real Zaragoza won 6–2 on aggregate.

Borussia Mönchengladbach won 6–2 on aggregate.

Hamburg won 10–1 on aggregate.

Twente won 3–1 on aggregate.

Dukla Prague won 5–1 on aggregate.

Amsterdam won 2–1 on aggregate.

Napoli won 2–0 on aggregate.

2–2 on aggregate, Ajax won on away goals rule.

Third round

|}

First leg

Second leg

Baník Ostrava won 3–1 on aggregate.

Hamburg won 6–3 on aggregate.

Twente won 6–3 on aggregate.

Köln won 5–2 on aggregate.

Borussia Mönchengladbach won 9–2 on aggregate.

Amsterdam won 5–1 on aggregate.

2–2 on aggregate; Juventus won on away goals.

Velež Mostar won 5–4 on aggregate.

Quarter-finals

|}

First leg

Second leg

Juventus won 2–0 on aggregate.

Köln won 8–3 on aggregate.

Twente won 2–1 on aggregate.

Borussia Mönchengladbach won 4–1 on aggregate.

Semi-finals

|}

First leg

Second leg

Twente won 4–1 on aggregate.

Borussia Mönchengladbach won 4–1 on aggregate.

Final

First leg

Second leg

Borussia Mönchengladbach won 5–1 on aggregate.

External links
1974/75 Season at UEFA.com
UEFA Cup 1974-75 at RSSSF.com

UEFA Cup seasons
2